Amber Lake may refer to:

Places
 Amber Lake, a lake in Martin County, Minnesota, US
 Amber Lake, a lake in Amber, Washington, US

Other uses
 Amber Lake, a 2010 film by Mekenna Melvin
 Amber Lake, a 2011 film by Joe Robert Cole
 Amber Lake (microprocessor), an Intel CPU microarchitecture

See also
 North Amber Lake, an alpine lake in Blaine County, Idaho, US
 South Amber Lake, an alpine lake in Blaine County, Idaho, US